The 2021 Tennis in the Land event was a professional women's tennis tournament played on outdoor hard courts at Jacobs Pavilion. It was the first edition of the tournament held in the city of Cleveland in the United States and was a part of the WTA 250 category of the 2021 WTA Tour.

Champions

Singles 

  Anett Kontaveit def.  Irina-Camelia Begu, 7–6(7–5), 6–4.

This was Kontaveit's second WTA Tour title, and first since 2017.

Doubles 

  Shuko Aoyama /  Ena Shibahara def.  Christina McHale /  Sania Mirza, 7–5, 6–3.

Points and prize money

Point distribution

Prize money 

1Qualifiers prize money is also the Round of 32 prize money.
*per team

Singles main-draw entrants

Seeds

 Rankings are as of August 16, 2021.

Other entrants
The following players received wildcards into the main draw:
  Daria Kasatkina
  Maria Mateas 
  Bethanie Mattek-Sands

The following players received entry from the qualifying draw:
  Emina Bektas 
  Ulrikke Eikeri 
  Alexa Glatch
  Catherine Harrison

The following players received entry as lucky losers:
  Linda Fruhvirtová
  Nagi Hanatani
  Tara Moore
  Ena Shibahara

Withdrawals
Before the tournament
  Jennifer Brady → replaced by  Kaja Juvan
  Johanna Konta → replaced by  Linda Fruhvirtová
  Jessica Pegula → replaced by  Caty McNally
  Storm Sanders → replaced by  Tara Moore
  Alison Riske → replaced by  Christina McHale
  Arantxa Rus → replaced by  Lauren Davis
  Liudmila Samsonova → replaced by  Ena Shibahara
  Jil Teichmann → replaced by  Nagi Hanatani
  Patricia Maria Țig → replaced by  Vera Zvonareva
  Elena Vesnina → replaced by  Aliaksandra Sasnovich
During the tournament
  Vera Zvonareva

Retirements
  Anna Blinkova

Doubles main-draw entrants

Seeds

Rankings are as of August 16, 2021.

Other entrants
The following pair received a wildcard into the doubles main draw:
  Maria Mateas /  Yaroslava Shvedova

The following pair received entry using a protected ranking:
  Anastasia Rodionova /  Galina Voskoboeva

Withdrawals
Before the tournament
  Kaja Juvan /  Galina Voskoboeva → replaced by  Anastasia Rodionova /  Galina Voskoboeva

References

External links 
 Official WTA tournament profile
 Official website

Tennis in the Land
Tennis in the Land
Tennis in the Land
Tennis in the Land
Sports competitions in Cleveland
Tennis in the Land
2020s in Cleveland
Tennis in Cleveland